Orlando de Jesús McFarlane Quesada (28 June 1938 – 18 July 2007) was a Cuban professional baseball player. He played as a catcher in Major League Baseball for the Pittsburgh Pirates, Detroit Tigers and California Angels in parts of five seasons spanning 1962–1968. Listed at 6' 0" ,180 lb. , he batted and threw right handed.

Early years
He was born and raised in Victoria de Las Tunas.

Career
McFarlane signed a free agent contract with the Pittsburgh Pirates in 1958. He spent two seasons in the Pirates minor league system before debuting in the Cuban League, where he played for the Alacranes de Almendares club during the 1959-60 and 1960-61 winter seasons.

Shortly thereafter, the Cuban government replaced the former professional baseball system with new amateur baseball leagues. As a result, like many Cuban ballplayers, McFarlane decided to migrate to the United States to try his luck in a new environment.

In 1961, McFarlane joined the Class A Asheville Tourists, where he posted a solid slash line of  .301/.400/.528 with 74 runs batted in in 114 games, including 21 home runs and 27 stolen bases, a remarkable total for a catcher, being named the best prospect in the South Atlantic League.

MacFarlane opened 1962 at Triple A Columbus Jets, hitting for them a .308 average with 11 homers and 61 RBI. He would make his debut with the Pirates near the end of the year, appearing in eight games, but he never achieved the success predicted for him at Asheville.

After that, MacFarlane spent one and a half season at Triple A and returned to the Pirates for a brief stint in 1964. He then battled with injuries and inconsistency throughout the next three years, as he split time between the Majors and the Minors with the Tigers and Angels organizations.

MacFarlane later played parts of four seasons in the minor leagues, concluding in 1971 with the Diablos Rojos del México which had acquired him from the Tidewater Tides for Francisco Estrada on 30 November 1970. In a ten-season minors career, he slashed .285/.372/.478 with 129 home runs and 544 RBI in 960 games appearances.

In between, Mc Farlane played winter ball for the Águilas Cibaeñas in the Dominican Republic, where he led the league in home runs in 1963-64 (10) and 1964-65 (8). Additionally, he played with the Tigres de Aragua in Venezuela and the Leones de Ponce in Puerto Rico, where he lived for the rest of his life.

Even more, Mc Farlane gained notoriety in Puerto Rico when he had his wedding ceremony performed at the Estadio Francisco Montaner, homestand of the Leones.

Death
McFarlane died in 2007 in Ponce, Puerto Rico, at the age of 69.

References

1938 births
2007 deaths
Águilas Cibaeñas players
Cuban expatriate baseball players in the Dominican Republic
Almendares (baseball) players
Asheville Tourists players
Burials at Cementerio Civil de Ponce
Burlington Bees players
California Angels players
Columbus Jets players
Detroit Tigers players
Diablos Rojos del México players
Dubuque Packers players
Grand Forks Chiefs players
Hawaii Islanders players
Leones de Ponce players
Cuban expatriate baseball players in Puerto Rico
Major League Baseball catchers
Major League Baseball players from Cuba
Cuban expatriate baseball players in the United States
People from Las Tunas (city)
Pittsburgh Pirates players
Salem Rebels players
Seattle Angels players
Tidewater Tides players
Tigres de Aragua players
Cuban expatriate baseball players in Venezuela
21st-century African-American people